Andrei Smirnov (born April 24, 1990) is a Russian professional ice hockey player who has played in the Kontinental Hockey League for Severstal Cherepovets and Metallurg Novokuznetsk.

References

External links

1990 births
Living people
Buran Voronezh players
HC Izhstal players
Metallurg Novokuznetsk players
Severstal Cherepovets players
Russian ice hockey centres